Sympistis melalutea is a species of moth in the family Noctuidae (the owlet moths).

The MONA or Hodges number for Sympistis melalutea is 10107.

References

Further reading

 
 
 

melalutea
Articles created by Qbugbot
Moths described in 1899